Cosmioconcha rikae is a species of sea snail, a marine gastropod mollusk in the family Columbellidae, the dove snails.

Description
The length of the shell attains 7.9 mm.

Distribution
This species occurs in the Caribbean Sea off Panama.

References

 Monsecour, K. & Monsecour, D., 2006. Two new Cosmioconcha (Gastropoda: Neogastropoda: Columbellidae) from the Caribbean. Gloria Maris 45(1-2): 7-13

External links
 Rosenberg, G.; Moretzsohn, F.; García, E. F. (2009). Gastropoda (Mollusca) of the Gulf of Mexico, Pp. 579–699 in: Felder, D.L. and D.K. Camp (eds.), Gulf of Mexico–Origins, Waters, and Biota. Texas A&M Press, College Station, Texas

Columbellidae
Gastropods described in 2006